O'Brien is a surname of Irish origin. It has many variants in the Irish diaspora worldwide, such as Brien, O'Bryan, O'Brian, Brian, O'Brine and O'Bryen which all claim a general common ancestry. The original Gaelic surname is Ó Briain (plural, Uí Briain). Notable people with the name include:

As surname

A
Aidan O'Brien (b. 1969), Irish race horse trainer
Aiden O'Brien, Irish football player
Alan O'Brien, Irish association football player
Alex O'Brien (b. 1970), professional American tennis player
Ambrose O'Brien
Andy O'Brien (disambiguation), various
Anne O'Brien (disambiguation), various
Arthur O'Brien
Austin O'Brien

B
Barry O'Brien
Billy O'Brien (baseball) (1860–1911), American baseball player
Billy O'Brien (footballer), Welsh association football player
Brendan O'Brien (disambiguation), various
Brenna O'Brien
Brock O'Brien
Buck O'Brien
Burton O'Brien

C
Cathy O'Brien (athlete) (b. 1967), American long-distance runner
Cathy O'Brien (conspiracy theorist) (b. 1957), purported American child-slave/sex-abuse victim
Charles O'Brien (disambiguation), various
Christian O'Brien (1914-2001), British geologist, author & historian
Ciaran O'Brien
Cinders O'Brien
Clinton O'Brien (b. 1974), Australian rugby league footballer
Conal O'Brien
Conan O'Brien (b. 1963), US comedian and talk show host
Connor O'Brien (disambiguation)
Conor O'Brien (disambiguation), various
Cubby O'Brien

D
Daniel O'Brien (disambiguation), various
Danielle O'Brien
Danny O'Brien (disambiguation), various
Dara Ó Briain, Irish comedian and presenter
Darcy O'Brien (1939–1998), American true crime author
Daryl O'Brien (b. 1941), Australian footballer (Australian rules football)
Dave O'Brien (actor) (1912–1969), American film actor
Dave O'Brien (sportscaster), American sportscaster
David O'Brien (disambiguation), various
Doug Brien (born 1970), former American football placekicker
Don Brien (born 1959), Canadian sprint canoer, who competed in the mid to late 1980s
Declan O'Brien, president of Utopia Pictures & Television, and a writer and producer
Declan O'Brien (footballer)
Dennis O'Brien (disambiguation), various
Derek O'Brien (disambiguation), various
Dermod O'Brien (1865–1906), Irish painter
Donald O'Brien (disambiguation), various
Doug O'Brien
Dylan O'Brien (b. 1991), American actor

E
Ed O'Brien (b. 1968), English musician
Edmond O'Brien (1915–1985), American actor
Edna O'Brien (b. 1930), Irish novelist
Edward O'Brien (disambiguation), various
Edwin Frederick O'Brien, Grand Master of the Equestrian Order of the Holy Sepulchre of Jerusalem
Eileen O'Brien (disambiguation), various
Elaine O'Brien, American politician
Erin O'Brien (writer), American writer
Erin Joanne O'Brien (b. 1935), American actress
Eugene O'Brien (disambiguation), various

F
Fergal O'Brien, Irish professional snooker player
Fergus O'Brien (1930–2016), Irish politician
Fitz James O'Brien, Irish born American novelist
Flann O'Brien, pen name of Irish novelist and satirist Brian O'Nolan

G
Gareth O'Brien
Geraldine O'Brien
George O'Brien (disambiguation), various
Ger O'Brien
Geoffrey O'Brien
Glenn O'Brien
Gray O'Brien
Gavin O'Brien

H
Harry O'Brien (changed his name in 2013 to "Heritier Lumumba")
Harry J. O'Brien
Henry O'Brien (disambiguation), various
Hod O'Brien (1936–2016), American jazz pianist
Hugh O'Brien (1827–1895) mayor of Boston

I
Iain O'Brien
Ian O'Brien
Ignatius O'Brien, 1st Baron Shandon (1857–1930), Lord Chancellor of Ireland, 1913–1918

J
Jack O'Brien (disambiguation), various
Jake O'Brien
James O'Brien (disambiguation)
Jamie O'Brien (disambiguation), various
Jeremiah O'Brien (1744–1818), US Navy officer of the American Revolutionary War
Jesse O'Brien (disambiguation), various
Jim O'Brien (disambiguation)
Joan O'Brien
Joe O'Brien (disambiguation), various
Joey O'Brien
John O'Brien (disambiguation), various
Joseph O'Brien (disambiguation), various

K
Kate O'Brien (disambiguation)
Katharine O'Brien
Katherine O'Brien
Kathleen O'Brien
Katie O'Brien, British female tennis player
Keith O'Brien (1938-2018), Roman Catholic Cardinal Archbishop of Saint Andrews and Edinburgh
Ken O'Brien
Kerry O'Brien (disambiguation)
Kevin O'Brien (disambiguation), various
Kieran O'Brien
Kim O'Brien, American film and television actress
Kirsten O'Brien (born 1972), British TV presenter
Kitt O'Brien (born 1990), American football player
Kitty Wilmer O'Brien, Irish painter

L
Larry O'Brien (1917–1990), American politician
Larry O'Brien (Canadian politician), Canadian entrepreneur and politician; Mayor of Ottawa, 2006–2010
Laurence O'Brien
Lawrence D. O'Brien
Leighton O'Brien
Lévis Brien (born 1955), Quebec politician
Leo O'Brien (disambiguation), various
Leonora O'Brien, Irish pharmacist and entrepreneur
Leslie O'Brien
Liam O'Brien (disambiguation), various
Lucy O'Brien
Luke O'Brien

M
Margaret O'Brien
Mariah O'Brien 
Mark O'Brien (disambiguation), various
Matthew O'Brien (1814-1855), Irish mathematician
Maureen O'Brien
Michael O'Brien (disambiguation), various
Michele O'Brien
Mick O'Brien (disambiguation), various
Mike O'Brien (hurler)
Miles O'Brien (disambiguation), various
Mollie O'Brien

N
Niall O'Brien (disambiguation), various
Nick O'Brien

O
Olivia O'Brien (born 1999), American singer and songwriter

P
Paddy O'Brien (disambiguation), various
Parry O'Brien
Patricia Salas O'Brien (born 1958), Peruvian sociologist and Minister of Education
Patrick O'Brien (disambiguation), for people with forename Patrick or Pat
Pat O'Brien (disambiguation), various
Paul O'Brien (disambiguation), various
Peter O'Brien (disambiguation), various
Phil O'Brien (disambiguation), several people

R
Raymond O'Brien, American Roman Catholic priest
Richard O'Brien (disambiguation), various
Riley O'Brien, American baseball player
Robert O'Brien (disambiguation), various
Rory Brien
Ron O'Brien (disambiguation), various
Roy O'Brien

S
Scott O'Brien
Sean O'Brien (disambiguation)
Shane O'Brien (disambiguation), various
Shannon O'Brien
Sicele O'Brien, Irish aviator
Simon O'Brien (disambiguation), various
Soledad O'Brien, American television journalist
Stephen O'Brien, UK conservative politician for Eddisbury
Stuart O'Brien (1906–2004), American film editor
Stuart O'Brien (stage) (1833–1883), Australian actor

T
Terence O'Brien (disambiguation), various
Thomas O'Brien (disambiguation), various
Tim O'Brien (disambiguation), various
Timothy O'Brien (theatre designer) (born 1929), British theatre designer
Timothy O'Brien (endocrinologist), Irish professor
Timothy L. O'Brien (born 1961), American journalist
Tina O'Brien (born 1983), English actress
Tom O'Brien (actor) (b. 1965), American film actor
Tom O'Brien (American football) (b. 1948), American college football coach at North Carolina State University
Tom O'Brien (outfielder) (1873–1901), baseball outfielder
Tom O'Brien (second baseman) (1860–1921), 19th century baseball player
Tom O'Brien (trade unionist) (1900–1970), British trade unionist and Member of Parliament
Tommy O'Brien (baseball) (1918–1978), baseball outfielder

U
Una O'Brien, British civil servant

V
Vincent O'Brien (disambiguation), various
Virginia O'Brien

W
Walter O'Brien, Computer expert and Irish businessman
Walter A. O'Brien, American Progressive Party politician
William O'Brien (disambiguation), various
Willis H. O'Brien (1886–1962), American motion picture special effects pioneer

Z
Zach O'Brien, professional ice hockey player

As first or middle names
 O'Brien Alston (b. 1965), American former football linebacker
 O'Brien Schofield (b. 1987), American former football linebacker
 O'Brien Smith ( – 1811), Irish-American political figure

Fictional people named O'Brien 
O'Brien, a character in George Orwell's novel Nineteen Eighty-Four
Lady Cassandra O'Brien, fictional character, Doctor Who antagonist
Chloe O'Brian, a fictional character played by actress Mary Lynn Rajskub on the US television series 24
Graham O'Brien, a companion of the Thirteenth Doctor in the BBC series Doctor Who
Keiko O'Brien, fictional character, wife of Miles O'Brien in Star Trek: The Next Generation and Deep Space Nine
Miles O'Brien, a fictional character in Star Trek: The Next Generation and Deep Space Nine
Sarah O'Brien, a fictional character on the ITV series Downton Abbey
Shelia O'Brian, a character from the animated TV series Dungeons and Dragons
Mr. O'Brien, Mrs. O'Brien and Jack O'Brien, fictional characters in The Tree of Life film

See also
O'Brien dynasty, the royal dynasty who ruled Thomond

Lists of people by surname
Surnames of Irish origin
English-language surnames